Wolfgang Plagge (born 23 August 1960 in Oslo, Norway by Dutch parents) is a Norwegian composer and pianist.

Biography 
Plagge started playing the piano as four years old, and made a sensational recital debut in the University Hall in Oslo, only twelve years old. He also started composing at an early age, had his first work published aged twelve, and is particularly renowned for his works for wind instruments. Despite a rheumatic disorder Plagge often occurs as pianist and has played with several leading orchestras. He has received several awards for his musical work. He has been performing as a soloist with a large number of orchestras in and outside of Norway, and has worked with internationally renowned artists like Ole Edvard Antonsen, Jens Harald Bratlie, Aleksandr Dmitriyev, Philippe Entremont, Lutz Herbig, Piotr Janowski, Evgeni Koroliov, Solveig Kringlebotn, Truls Mørk, Robert Oppenheimer, Robert Rønnes, Leif Segerstam, Randi Stene, Roberto Szidon, Lars Anders Tomter and Frøydis Ree Wekre.

Plagge has since he was 8 years been organist and eventually Cantor in Asker and Bærum congregation of The Catholic Church in Stabekk, Norway. He has a significant number of musical contribution to the Catholic hymnbook in Norway, "Lov Herren" (Praise the Lord).

In 2007 he was the recipient of the Hungarian The international cultural order of knights of St. Stefan which is Hungary's highest civilian honor for his work on promoting Hungarian music and culture in the Nordic countries, as well as his work with the teaching technique of Zoltán Kodály.

Honors 
1970: Talent award at British television
1971: Youth Piano Championship in Oslo
1996: “Composer of the Year” with the Trondheim Symphony Orchestra
2001: American ASCAP Award
2003: Winner of Vocal Nord composers’ contest
2014: Bærum Culture Award

Works 
Compositions (in selection)
1982/88: Musikk for to klaverer, op. 17
1988/89: Horn Sonata I, for horn og klaver “A Litany for the 21st Century”, 1988/89
1990: Konsert for horn og orkester, op. 49
1990/91: : Konsert for fiolin og orkester, op. 551992/2001: Solarljod for sopran og klaver, op. 681995/97: Concerto Grosso I for fagott, klaver og orkester, op. 851996/2001: Concerto Grosso II for to klaverer, messingkvintett og pauke, op. 871999/2000: Liknarbraut (Nådens veg), kantate for blandet kor, op. 1021999/2000: Sonate for trompet og klaver, op. 1032000: Blücher, trio for fløyte, fagott og klaver, op. 1042001: Reflections, 6 stykker for klaver, inspirert av Beethovens Bagateller op. 126, op. 1132001: Liber Squentiarum Nidrosiensis, Sekvens fra Nidaros erkebispesete for sang og trompet, op. 1142001: Violin Sonata IV, for fiolin og klaver, op. 116''

Discography (in selection) 
DISCOGRAPHY (COMPOSER)
MUSIC FOR TWO PIANOS op 17 (Koroliov Piano duo) 2L CD6
ELEVAZIONE op 21 (Boye Hansen / Bratlie) BD 7035C
ASTEROIDE SUITE op 33 (Follesø / Kjekshus) 2L CD14
SONATA I op 39 horn & piano (Bonet / Banados) Verso VRS 2003
SONATA I op 43 bassoon & piano (Rønnes / Knardahl) SIMAX PSC1077
FESTIVAL MUSIC op 46 no 3 (HMKG symph. Band / Andresen) SONET SCD 15022
CONCERTO op 49 horn & orchestra (Wekre / TSO) SIMAX PSC1100
MONOCEROS op 51 (Wekre) 2L CD25
CANZONA op 53 (Arctic Brass / Plagge) SIMAX PSC1074
MUSIC FOR CELLO op 54 (Kvalbein) Aurora ACD 5040
SONATA op 64 euphonium & piano (Olsrud / Hennig) SSO01
FACSIMILES op 66 (Faukstad) BD 7028C
SONATA II op 67 horn & piano (Wekre / Plagge) 2L CD25
SÓLARLJÓÐ op 68 (Kringlebotn / Plagge) 2L CD5
CONCERTO GROSSO II op 85 (Koroliov Piano duo / Stensø / Arctic Brass) 2L CD6 
SONATA III op 88 horn & piano (Wekre / Plagge) 2L CD25
RHAPSODY op 89 (Follesø) 2L CD14

References

External links 

Member of the Norwegian Society of Composers

1960 births
Norwegian composers
Norwegian male composers
Norwegian classical pianists
Simax Classics artists
Academic staff of the Barratt Due Institute of Music
Living people
Place of birth missing (living people)
Norwegian male pianists
21st-century classical pianists
21st-century Norwegian male musicians